David Nyhan (December 23, 1940 – January 23, 2005), born Charles David Nyhan Jr., was a journalist and biographer, whose op-ed column ran in The Boston Globe newspaper for many years.  He graduated from Harvard College where he played varsity football.

His column was syndicated to more than 16 newspapers and magazines by Creators Syndicate, and after working for The Boston Globe for 32 years, he retired in 2001.

Boston-area professor and editor Bill Ketter remarked "For David Nyhan, giving voice to the voiceless was intuitive." He covered national politics and was a frequent source for commentary on presidential races and on the New Hampshire primary in particular.

In his last column, he wrote: "The thing I'll miss most is the chance to shine a little flashlight on a dark corner, where a wrong was done to a powerless peon, where a scarred politician maybe deserved a better fate, where the process went awry, or the mob needed to be calmed down and herded in another direction."

Nyhan died suddenly aged 64 on January 23, 2005, at his home in Brookline, suffering a heart attack after shoveling snow.

Legacy
The Shorenstein Center on Media, Politics and Public Policy at Harvard University established the David Nyhan Prize for Political Journalism in his honor. The first recipient of the prize was David Willman in 2005.

Notes

External links

American male journalists
American columnists
1940 births
2005 deaths
The Boston Globe people
20th-century American journalists
Harvard Crimson football players